Naples of Olden Times (Italy: Napoli d'altri tempi) is a 1938 Italian musical comedy film directed by Amleto Palermi and starring Vittorio De Sica, Emma Gramatica and Elisa Cegani. It was made at Cinecittà in Rome.

Synopsis
At the beginning of the Twentieth century, a young employee of a Naples shop dreams of becoming a famous singer.

Cast
 Vittorio De Sica as Mario Esposito  
 Emma Gramatica as Maddalena Errante  
 Elisa Cegani as Maria  
 María Denis as Ninetta  
 Olga Vittoria Gentilli as Zia Bettina  
 Giuseppe Porelli as Barracchi  
 Enrico Glori as Maurizio 
 Gianni Altieri as De Stasio  
 Vittorio Bianchi as Il marchese Leopoldo Piermarini  
 Nicola Maldacea as Nicola  
 Agostino Salvietti as Luigino 
 Guglielmo Sinaz as L'impiegato di Casa Ricordi

References

Bibliography 
 Gundle, Stephen. Mussolini's Dream Factory: Film Stardom in Fascist Italy. Berghahn Books, 2013.
 Liehm, Mira. Passion and Defiance: Film in Italy from 1942 to the Present. University of California Press, 1984.

External links 
 

1938 films
Italian musical comedy films
Italian historical comedy films
Italian black-and-white films
1938 musical comedy films
1930s historical comedy films
1930s Italian-language films
Films directed by Amleto Palermi
Films set in Naples
Films set in the 1900s
Films shot at Cinecittà Studios
Italian historical musical films
1930s historical musical films
Films scored by Alessandro Cicognini
1930s Italian films